Los Feliz Boulevard is a street in Glendale and Los Angeles, California, United States.

The west-east thoroughfare runs through Los Angeles and Glendale.  It is the primary thoroughfare of the Los Feliz neighborhood. It starts off at its easternmost point at Glendale Avenue in Glendale as Los Feliz Road. After passing the Metrolink railroad tracks in western Glendale, it enters Los Angeles and becomes Los Feliz Boulevard.

Los Feliz passes through Atwater Village and serves as the demarkation of the south east corner of Griffith Park.  It is exit 141 off the Golden State Freeway.  From there it generally parallels the southern border of Griffith Park, offset by a couple of residential blocks.  After Griffith Park, at the American Film Institute Conservatory, it swerves to a north-south street and ends. It then merges and becomes Western Avenue, which runs all the way down to its southern terminus near the tide pools in the San Pedro area.  Going north on Vermont Avenue leads to the Greek Theatre and Griffith Observatory.

Notable landmarks
 Griffith Park
 Philosophical Research Society

Transportation
The following lines operate on Los Feliz Boulevard:
 Metro Local lines 180 headed for Hollywood and Pasadena.
 DASH Los Feliz runs on Los Feliz boulevard between Vermont and Hillhurst and connects to Metro Red Line subway service at Sunset and Vermont.

References

External links
 

Streets in Los Angeles
Streets in Los Angeles County, California
Transportation in Glendale, California
Atwater Village, Los Angeles
Los Feliz, Los Angeles